Anthony Louis Lovel Coke, 6th Earl of Leicester (11 September 1909 – 19 June 1994), was a British peer.

Background
Coke (pronounced Cook) was the son of the Hon Arthur George Coke and Phyllis Hermione, a daughter of Francis Saxham Elwes Drury (son of The Rev. Henry Drury, Archdeacon of Wilts, and the great-grandson of The Rev. Joseph Drury, D.D., headmaster of Harrow School and teacher of Lord Byron). His father was the second son of Thomas Coke, 3rd Earl of Leicester and was killed in action in 1915 during the First World War. Anthony was educated at Gresham's School, Holt.

Career
During the Second World War, Coke served in the Royal Air Force. In the late 1950s, he became a Land Development Officer (L.D.O.) in Rhodesia, attached to what was then known as the Native Affairs Department (later renamed the Internal Affairs Department). He and his wife, Vera, were based in the Mondoro Reserve near Hartley, where he was responsible for educating and assisting African farmers.

In 1976 he succeeded his first cousin Thomas as 6th Earl of Leicester, inheriting a substantial estate based on Holkham Hall in Norfolk, but remained living in South Africa, as his eldest son had already taken over the management of the estate.

Marriages and children
Leicester was married firstly on 11 September 1934 to Moyra Joan Crossley, daughter of Douglas Crossley. They had two sons and one daughter together:

 Edward Douglas Coke, 7th Earl of Leicester (born 6 May 1936, died 25 April 2015)
 Lady Almary Bridget Coke (born 18 June 1939)
 Hon Wenman John Coke (born 24 May 1940)

They were divorced in 1947 in which year Leicester married Vera Haigh in Southern Rhodesia. She died in 1984 and Leicester married thirdly in 1985, Elizabeth Hope Johnstone, daughter of Clifford Arthur Johnstone, of Addo, Eastern Province, South Africa.

Leicester died on 12 August 1994 at age 84 in South Africa. He was succeeded in the earldom and other titles by his son Edward Coke, 7th Earl of Leicester.

References

Further reading
Who's Who 1993 (A. & C. Black, London, 1993)

External links

1909 births
1994 deaths
6th Earl of Leicester
People educated at Gresham's School
Royal Air Force officers
Anthony Coke
Royal Air Force personnel of World War II
Military personnel from London